Cimberis is a genus of pine flower snout beetles in the family Nemonychidae. There are about 10 described species in Cimberis.

Species
These 10 species belong to the genus Cimberis:
 Cimberis attelaboides (Fabricius & J.C., 1787)
 Cimberis bihirsuta Hatch, 1971
 Cimberis bihirsutus Hatch, 1972
 Cimberis compta (LeConte in LeConte & Horn, 1876)
 Cimberis decipiens Kuschel, 1989
 Cimberis elongata (LeConte in LeConte & Horn, 1876)
 Cimberis pallipennis (Blatchley & Leng, 1916)
 Cimberis parvulus Hatch, 1972
 Cimberis pilosa (LeConte in LeConte & Horn, 1876)
 Cimberis turbans Kuschel, 1989

References

Further reading

External links

 

Polyphaga
Articles created by Qbugbot